Kakamari is a village in Belgaum district in the southwestern state of Karnataka, India. It belongs to Belgaum Division. It is located 164 km towards North from District headquarters Belgaum. 35 km from Athni. 583 km from State capital Bangalore

Kakamari Pin code is 591265 and postal head office is Telsang. Kohalli (11 km), Aigali (12 km), Adahalli (15 km) are the nearby Villages to Kakamari. Kakamari is surrounded by Athni Taluk towards west, Jamkhandi Taluk towards South, Bijapur Taluk towards East, Kavathemahankal Taluk towards west. Bijapur, Sangole, Rabkavi Banhatti, Terdal are the nearby Cities to Kakamari.

Kakamari 2011 Census Details 
Kakamari Local Language is Kannada. Kakamari Village Total population is 5509 and number of houses are 1102. Female Population is 49.4%. Village literacy rate is 53.9% and the Female Literacy rate is 22.6%.

Population 

Kakamari Census More Details.

Politics in Kakamari 
JD(U), BJP, INC are the major political parties in this area.

Polling Stations /Booths near Kakamari 
Govt. Higher Kannada Primary School South Room Adahallatti 
Govt. Higher Primary Kannada School North Room Kakamari
Govt. Kannada Higher primary School North Room Shegunshi
Nammura Govt. Kannada Lower Primary School Western Side Room Vadratti Athani Rural. 
Nammura Govt.Kannada Higher Primary School South Room Kottalagi

References

Villages in Belagavi district